For other songs of the same name, see New York, New York (disambiguation)

"New York, New York" is the debut single written and performed by American alt-country musician Ryan Adams. It appears on his 2001 album Gold. The song earned Adams a Grammy Award nomination for Best Male Rock Vocal, and the single reached No. 53 in the UK charts in December 2001. In 2009, the song was included in The Guardian newspaper's "1000 Songs Everyone Must Hear".

Content
The song's lyrics mention several lower Manhattan geographic references, including the intersection of Avenue A and 10th Street, Houston Street, and Avenue B. In the song, the singer reflects on his life in New York and a failed love affair.

Personnel
Ryan Adams - vocals, acoustic guitar
Richard Causon - piano
Chris Stills - bass
Kamasi Washington - saxophone
Ethan Johns - electric guitars, Hammond B-3, congas, drums

Music video
The music video features Adams performing in front of the Manhattan skyline from Brooklyn. Filmed on September 7, 2001, four days before the September 11 attacks on the World Trade Center, the Twin Towers can be prominently seen in the background.  As a result, a message was placed at the end of the video, dedicating it to those who lost their lives, and to "those who worked to save them".  Profits from the video were donated to a September 11 charity.

Adams had previously filmed and finished an entirely different video for the song, but decided at the last minute to scrap it and film a new one focusing on the Manhattan skyline (specifically the World Trade Center). The original video was not lost; it was dubbed over and reused for When the Stars Go Blue.

Track listing 
 "New York, New York"
 "Mara Lisa"
 "From Me to You"

Chart performance
The song peaked at #18 on the U.S. Billboard Adult Top 40 for the week ending February 2, 2002.

References

2001 songs
2001 debut singles
Songs about New York City
Ryan Adams songs
Songs written by Ryan Adams
Lost Highway Records singles